Devara Kannu is a 1975 Indian Kannada-language film, directed by Y. R. Swamy. The film stars Lokesh, Aarathi, Anant Nag and Ambareesh, who were relative newcomers, in supporting roles. The film has musical score by T. G. Lingappa. The film is based on a Bengali novel by Dr. Nihar Ranjan Gupta. The film was remade in Tamil as Annan Oru Koyil, in Malayalam as Ellaam Ninakku Vendi and in Telugu as Bangaru Chellelu - making it the third Kannada movie to be remade in three other South Indian languages after School Master and Sampathige Savaal.

Cast

Lokesh
Aarathi
Anant Nag
Ambareesh
Jayalakshmi
Dheerendra Gopal
Shakti Prasad
M. N. Lakshmidevi
Vijayakala
Leena Das

Soundtrack
The music was composed by T. G. Lingappa.

References

External links
 
 

1975 films
Indian drama films
1970s Kannada-language films
Kannada films remade in other languages
Films scored by T. G. Lingappa
Films based on Indian novels
Films directed by Y. R. Swamy
Films based on works by Nihar Ranjan Gupta